Konanki is a village in Guntur district of the Indian state of Andhra Pradesh. It is the headquarters of Piduguralla mandal in Gurazala revenue division.

See also 
 List of villages in Guntur district

References 

Villages in Guntur district
Mandal headquarters in Guntur district